Stephanos Stephanou (Greek: Στέφανος Στεφάνου) is a Greek Cypriot politician. From 2021 he has served as the General Secretary for the Progressive Party of Working People (AKEL) and since 2016 as a representative under AKEL for the Nicosia Electoral District.

Biography 
Stefanos Stefanou was born in Gerolakkos on 21 January 1965. Following the Turkish invasion of Cyprus in 1974 he moved to Deftera, his father's birthplace. He studied political science at the Academy of Social and Political Science in Sofia, Bulgaria. He is married to Georgia Zenonos with whom he has two daughters.

Political Career 
During his studies he was the president of the Organisation of Cypriot Students in Bulgaria. Following the completion of his studies in 1989, he worked for the United Democratic Youth Organisation (EDON). Since 1995 onwards, he has been a member of AKEL's Central Committee. During the period 1996-2001, he was EDON's General Secretary. During the period 2001-2008 he was a Special Adviser to the President of the House of Representatives, Demetris Christofias. In 2008-2013 he was the Government Spokesperson under Demetris Christofia's administration. Since 2011 he has been a member of AKEL's Political Bureau. Since 2016 he has been AKEL's Central Committee's Spokesperson and AKEL's  Head of the Press and Communication Office.

During the 2016 parliamentary election, he was elected as a representative of the Nicosia Electoral District under AKEL for the 2016 Legislative Session. He was re-elected in the 2021 parliamentary election for the 2021 Legislative Session. 

As a representative, he is a:

 Member of the Committee of Selection;
 Deputy Chairman of the House Standing Committee on Refugees-Enclaved-Missing-Adversely Affected Persons;
 Member of the House Standing Committee on Development Plans and Public Expenditure Control;
 Member of the House Standing Committee on Financial and Budgetary Affairs and of the Ad Hoc House Committee on the Investigation of Issues Relating to Loans of Politically Exposed Persons, and;
 The Head of the delegation of the House to the Parliamentary Assembly of the Mediterranean (PAM).
At the 23rd Party Congress, held on 4 July 2021, he was elected General Secretary of the party's Central Committee, securing 74 votes or 71.84% against 29 votes or 28.16% obtained by fellow candidate Yiorgos Loukaides.

References 

1965 births
Living people
Cypriot politicians